Xantholopha is a monotypic moth genus in the subfamily Arctiinae. Its single species, Xantholopha purpurascens, is found in Paraná, Brazil. Both the genus and species were first described by William Schaus in 1899.

References

Lithosiini
Monotypic moth genera